Elizabeth Zharoff (born March 19, 1986, in Wenatchee, Washington ) is an American opera singer and web video producer. After largely putting her operatic career on hold, she devoted herself to the topics of voice and singing on the YouTube channel, "The Charismatic Voice". She works primarily as a voice coach and singer and arranger of video game soundtracks. She also interviews rock vocalists.

Life and career

Opera
Elizabeth Zharoff grew up in Wenatchee, WA. After high school, she studied voice at the Conservatory of Music in Oberlin, Ohio, until 2009. While still a student, she took part in several prestigious music competitions and made her debut as a soloist at Carnegie Hall in 2009. In the same year she reached the semi-finals of the Metropolitan Opera National Council Auditions and won the renowned Queen Elisabeth Competition two years later. In 2012 she completed a master's degree in opera singing from the Curtis Institute of Music in Philadelphia. After initial engagements at the Opera Philadelphia, Zharoff was a member of the Young Ensemble of the Semperoper in the 2012/13 season, where she sang Pamina in Mozart's Magic Flute and Violetta in Verdi's La traviata. In addition to embodying other soprano roles at various opera houses, she appeared on the concert stage with the Cleveland Orchestra and performed a chamber piece composed for her by Richard Danielpour. In the 2013/14 season she made her debut as Giunia in Lucio Silla at the Opéra National de Bordeaux.

Ingrid Gerk praised a performance by Zharoff in an otherwise disappointing production of La traviata at the English National Opera in 2015: 

She said of her own performance of Violetta in La Traviata:

YouTube
In August 2014, Zharoff launched her own YouTube channel, "The Charismatic Voice" under the motto "Demystifying singing", in which she addresses many facets of the human voice and singing. After the number of subscribers grew sharply during the first year of the COVID pandemic, she hired an assistant in the summer of 2020. Her approach is to upload reaction videos in which she analyzes and comments on different vocal aspects. At the suggestion of her subscribers, she began to devoted her analysis to rock and metal singers, whom she had never heard, such as Ronnie James Dio and Rob Halford and, increasingly, to extreme, guttural vocals, featuring subgenres such as deathcore. In January 2021, she also began to conducting long-distance video "tea-time interviews" with well-known singers. Early guests included Lzzy Hale, James LaBrie, Will Ramos, and Devin Townsend.

Video games
She also arranges vocal parts for video games of various genres, including the real-time strategy game 0 AD and the point-and-click adventure game Elsinore, released in 2019 and which was nominated for "Best Original Choral Composition", "Best Original Song" with "Fair as a Rose", and "Best Original Soundtrack Album" at the 18th Annual G.A.N.G. Awards.

In addition, Elizabeth Zharoff offers online courses as a voice coach.

Zharoff is married and lives in Tucson, Arizona.

Opera repertoire 
 Samuel Barber : Antony and Cleopatra – Cleopatra 
 Vincenzo Bellini : La sonnambula - Amina
 Charles Gounod : Faust - Marguerite
 Leoš Janáček : The sly little vixen – Sly little vixen
 Claudio Monteverdi : L'incoronazione di Poppea - Drusilla
 Wolfgang Amadeus Mozart : The Abduction from the Seraglio - Konstanze
 Wolfgang Amadeus Mozart: The Magic Flute - Pamina
 Wolfgang Amadeus Mozart: Lucio Silla - Giunia
 Igor Stravinsky : The Rake's Progress - Anne Trulove
 Giuseppe Verdi : La traviata – Violetta
 Kurt Weill : Street Scene - Anna Maurrant

Ludography

Original Soundtracks

 2017: Aven Colony
 2018: Where the Water Tastes Like Wine
 2018: Yoku's Island Express
 2018: 0 AD
 2019: Devolver Digital Cinematic Universe: Phase 1 Original Soundtrack
 2019: Elsinore
 2020: Lost Words: Beyond the Page
 2021: Ambition: A Minute in Power

Compilations

 2016: Successor: Final Fantasy VIII Remixed 
 2016: Mobius: Sonic the Hedgehog Remixed
 2016: Pattern: An Homage to Everybody's Gone to the Rapture
 2016: Enraptured: BioShock Remixed
 2016: Fallen: An Undertale Tribute
 2016: Song Cycle: The History of Video Games
 2017: Zodiac: Final Fantasy Tactics Remixed
 2017: Tesseract: An Acoustic FEZ Album
 2017: Spira: Music from Final Fantasy X (Besaid Mix)
 2018: Fate: A Tribute to Majora's Mask
 2019: Exile: A Tribute to Supergiant Games
 2019: Resurrection of the Night: Alucard's Elegy
 2019: Epoch: A Tribute to Chrono Trigger
 2020: Flamesgrace: A Tribute to Octopath Traveler

References

American opera singers
1986 births
People from Wenatchee, Washington
Oberlin Conservatory of Music alumni